Winnie Lai Chu Ng (born 7 August 1952) is a Hong Kong long-distance runner. She competed in the women's marathon at the 1984 Summer Olympics. She holds a personal best of 2:42:38 hours for the marathon, set in 1984.

She was the inaugural winner of the Singapore Marathon in 1982 and won the Hong Kong Marathon in both 1980 and 1982. She has also won the Melbourne Marathon (1994), Taipei Marathon (1986) and the Macau Half Marathon (1999, 2001). She has raced at the world's highest level marathons, including the London Marathon, Boston Marathon, New York City Marathon, Tokyo Women's Marathon, Rotterdam Marathon and Nagoya Women's Marathon. Her best performance at that level was eight at the 1982 London Marathon.

She was twice a participant in the marathon at the World Championships in Athletics, finished 23rd in 1993 and 30th in 1995. She was entered for the 1983 World Championships Marathon but did not start the race.

International competitions

References

External links
 

1952 births
Living people
Place of birth missing (living people)
Hong Kong female long-distance runners
Hong Kong female marathon runners
Olympic athletes of Hong Kong
Athletes (track and field) at the 1984 Summer Olympics
World Athletics Championships athletes for Hong Kong